Yekaterina Kulikova (born 3 May 1968) is a Russian sprinter. She competed in the women's 4 × 400 metres relay at the 1996 Summer Olympics.

References

1968 births
Living people
Athletes (track and field) at the 1996 Summer Olympics
Russian female sprinters
Olympic athletes of Russia
Place of birth missing (living people)
World Athletics Indoor Championships winners
Olympic female sprinters